The Patawomeck Indian Tribe of Virginia is a state-recognized tribe in Virginia and a nonprofit organization of individuals who identify as descendants of the Patawomeck people. 

The Patawomeck Indian Tribe of Virginia is not federally recognized as a Native American tribe. The organization has never petitioned for federal recognition.
 
The Patawomeck people, more commonly known as the Potomac people, are a historic Eastern Algonquian–speaking tribe who lived on the Virginia.

State recognition 
Through House Joint Resolution No. 150, the Commonwealth of Virginia's legislators formally designated the Patawomeck Indian Tribe of Virginia as a state-recognized tribe in 2010. The resolution states: "That the General Assembly of Virginia, by this resolution, does not address the question of whether the tribe has been continuously in existence since 1776; and, be it RESOLVED FINALLY, That the Commonwealth, by this resolution does not confirm, confer or address in any manner any issues of sovereignty." Entertainer Wayne Newton, who identifies as Patawomeck, advocated for recognition.

Organizations 
In 2014, the Patawomeck Indian Tribe of Virginia formed a 501(c)(3) nonprofit organization, based in Fredericksburg, Virginia. 

Charles "Bootsy" Bullock serves as their president in 2022.

Robert Green of Fredericksburg, Virginia, identifies as "Chief Emeritus" of the Patawomeck Indians of Virginia and served as primary chief from 1996 to 2013. He also served as president of the Patawomeck Heritage Foundation from 2010 to 2015.

The related Patawomeck Heritage Foundation is a 501(c)(3) nonprofit organization, based in Colonial Beach, Virginia and incorporated in 2010. Its officers are:
 President: Lou Silver
 Treasurer: Mary Ann Berry, also agent
 Secretary: Annette Schaul.
 Executive assistant: Minne Lightner.

They have an estimated membership of 2,300.

Activities 
The organization is launching a cultural center and museum in Stafford County, scheduled to open during the summer of 2022. Stafford County is leading a 1890s brick farmhouse on 17-acres of land to the organization for $1 a year as part of a ten-year lease. Local businesses and foundations have provided grants to fund the restoration of the farmhouse.

References

External links
 Patawomeck Indian Tribe of Virginia
 State-recognized tribes, Commonwealth of Virginia

2010 establishments in Virginia
Cultural organizations based in Virginia
Non-profit organizations based in Virginia
State-recognized tribes in the United States